Sellafield is a railway station on the Cumbrian Coast Line, which runs between  and . It is owned by Network Rail and managed by Northern Trains.

The station, which dates from 1850, is a busy freight location, because much of the nuclear waste for Sellafield's THORP nuclear fuel reprocessing plant is carried there by train from the docks in Barrow-in-Furness, or from rail-connected nuclear power stations elsewhere in the UK. The facility also generates significant commuter traffic for the railway, with workers travelling by train from nearby towns and villages.

The station is at the end of the single-line section from Whitehaven, which is operated using the electric key token system. From there, the line south towards Ravenglass and Barrow is double track, except for the final section between Park South Junction (south of ) and Barrow, which was reduced to a single track in the late 1980s.

The station configuration is unusual in that the southbound ('up' line) is bi-directional through the station and has platform faces on both sides. However, only the eastern platform face is used, the other side being fenced off. The signal box controlling the layout is located at the north end of the station, whilst the exchange sidings for the plant, and the loco depot used by Direct Rail Services freight trains, are to the south. There are two water cranes at the station, one at each end.

The station used to be the southern terminus of the former Whitehaven, Cleator and Egremont Railway line from Egremont, from August 1869 until the line's closure in March 1964.

Facilities
The station is not staffed, but there is now a ticket machine in the main building for passengers to buy tickets prior to travel. There is a waiting room on the southbound platform and a shelter on the opposite side; the rest of the main buildings are in private commercial use. The platforms are linked by a footbridge which does not include ramps, so only the Barrow platform has step-free access.  Train running information is provided by digital information screens, timetable posters and telephone.

Services 

There is a basic hourly service (with a few variations) in each direction. Since the summer 2018 timetable came into effect on 20 May, trains operate later into the evening than previously and also on Sundays, the latter provision being the first since May 1976.

It was reported in November 2011 that Direct Rail Services (DRS) had applied to the Office of Rail Regulation to operate one train in each direction between Carlisle and Sellafield to carry workers to Sellafield. Between May 2015 and December 2018, four trains per day each way ran to provide additional seating capacity for workers at the Sellafield plant, using Mark 2 coaches and Class 37 diesel locomotives hired in from DRS.

References

External links 

 
 

Railway stations in Cumbria
DfT Category F1 stations
Former Furness Railway stations
Railway stations in Great Britain opened in 1850
Northern franchise railway stations
1850 establishments in England